State Route 203 (SR 203, OH 203) is a  long north–south state highway in the central portion of the U.S. state of Ohio.

Route description
SR 203 traverses the northwestern portion of Delaware County and the southern half of Marion County.  There are no segments of SR 203 that are included within the National Highway System (NHS), a network of highways deemed to be most important for the economy, mobility and defense of the country.

History
SR 203 was established in 1923.  The highway was originally routed along its current alignment between its present southern terminus, at the time designated as SR 47, and its junction with what is now SR 739, but in 1923 known as SR 38.  In 1938, SR 203 was extended north to its present terminus at what is now SR 309, but at the time a part of the now-defunct U.S. Route 30S (US 30S).

Major intersections

References

203
203
203